Cimicifuga (bugbane or cohosh) was a genus of between 12 and 18 species of flowering plants belonging to the family Ranunculaceae, native to temperate regions of the Northern Hemisphere.

The genus is now generally included in Actaea.

The name Cimicifuga means 'bedbug repeller'.

Selected species

Cimicifuga americana
Cimicifuga arizonica
Cimicifuga biternata
Cimicifuga brachycarpa
Cimicifuga dahurica - Sheng ma in Chinese
Cimicifuga elata
Cimicifuga europaea
Cimicifuga foetida 
Cimicifuga heracleifolia - both used in TCM as Sheng ma in Chinese
Cimicifuga japonica
Cimicifuga laciniata
Cimicifuga nanchuanensis
Cimicifuga racemosa
Cimicifuga rubifolia
Cimicifuga simplex
Cimicifuga yunnanensis

In pharmacology
Cimicifugae rhizoma - pharmacological term in herbal medicine (Cimicifuga/Actea root), translated as Sheng ma, Chinese herb

References

External links 
Flora of North America: Cimicifuga
Flora of China: Cimicifuga
The Plant List: "Actaea"

Wikimedia 

Ranunculaceae
Ranunculaceae genera
Historically recognized angiosperm genera